Rodney Charles Wakeman (born October 18, 1966) is an American politician and funeral director from Michigan. Wakeman is a Republican member of the Michigan House of Representatives for District 94.

Early life and education 
Wakeman was born on October 18, 1966 in Saginaw, Michigan. In 1988, Wakeman earned a degree in Mortuary Science from Wayne State University.

Career 
Wakeman was a contributing photographer for The Township Times. Wakeman is a businessman in the funeral industry. Since 1984, Wakeman is a co-owner and funeral home director of Wakeman Funeral Home, a family business.

Wakeman's opponent in the 2018 Michigan House of Representatives Republican primary election, Steve Gerhardt, requested a recount after Wakeman's close victory in the election. On September 5, 2018, the recount confirmed Wakeman won by 30 votes.

On November 6, 2018, Wakeman won the election and became a Republican member of the Michigan House of Representatives for District 94. Wakeman defeated Dave Adams with 55% of the votes.

See also 
 2018 Michigan House of Representatives election

References

External links 
 Rodney Wakeman at gophouse.com
 Rodney Wakeman at ballotpedia.org

Living people
1966 births
American funeral directors
Republican Party members of the Michigan House of Representatives
Politicians from Saginaw, Michigan
Wayne State University alumni
21st-century American politicians
Place of birth missing (living people)